may refer to:

 , a Japanese name
 Ōtori taisha (Ōtori Grand Shrine), a Shinto shrine in Osaka, Japan.
 Ōtori-class torpedo boat, a class of fast torpedo boats of the Imperial Japanese Navy.
 Japanese torpedo boat Ōtori, two boats of the Imperial Japanese Navy.
 , a drinking custom in Miyako Island, Okinawa Prefecture, Japan